Beth McRae is a public relations agent  and community leader, based in Phoenix, Arizona.

McRae chaired the 50th Anniversary of the American Heart Association's Phoenix Heart Ball in 2009, followed two years later by the 50th Anniversary Gala for the American Cancer Society in Phoenix.

In 1993, she founded an annual awards program to recognize excellence in the field of public relations for the Public Relations Society of America, San Diego Chapter, called the Edward L. Bernays Awards.

References

Living people
American public relations people
People from Phoenix, Arizona
Year of birth missing (living people)